"Fix a Drink" is a song co-written and recorded by American country music singer Chris Janson. It was released in May 2017 as the first single from his album Everybody, which was released in September 2017. Janson co-wrote the song with Chris DuBois and Ashley Gorley.

Music video
The music video was directed by Michael Monaco and premiered on CMT, GAC & CMT Music in July 2017.

The song has sold 152,000 copies in the United States as of November 2017.

Charts

Weekly charts

Year-end charts

Certifications

References

2017 songs
2017 singles
Chris Janson songs
Warner Records Nashville singles
Songs written by Chris Janson
Songs written by Chris DuBois
Songs written by Ashley Gorley